Płoty  (formerly German Plothow) is a village in the administrative district of Gmina Czerwieńsk, within Zielona Góra County, Lubusz Voivodeship, in western Poland.

The village has a population of 786.

References

Villages in Zielona Góra County